MCX may refer to:
 Manila Commodity Exchange, a commodity and derivatives exchange based in Makati, Philippines
 Multi Commodity Exchange, an independent commodity exchange based in India. 
 Merchant Customer Exchange, a joint venture with the desired purpose of offering a new platform for smartphone-based transactions
 MCX connector, a coaxial RF connector
 Muntinlupa–Cavite Expressway, an expressway between Muntinlupa and Cavite
 1110, in Roman numerals
 SIG Sauer MCX, a carbine series designed and manufactured by SIG Sauer